Air Marshal Harjit Singh Arora PVSM, AVSM, ADC (25 June 1961 – 21 January 2023) was an officer of the Indian Air Force and served as the Vice Chief of the Air Staff from 1 October 2019 to 30 June 2021. He was succeeded by Air Marshal Vivek Ram Chaudhari.

Early life and education 
Arora was an alumnus of the Defence Services Staff College, Wellington and the National Defence College, New Delhi. He graduated from the Tactics and Air Combat Development Establishment in Gwalior. He also had an M. Phil. in defence and strategic studies.

Career 
Arora was commissioned as a fighter pilot in the Indian Air Force in December 1981. He had flying experience of over 2600 hours on Mig-21, Mig-29, and also helicopters.

Arora has commanded a Mig-21 squadron and then Air Defence Direction Center as a Group Captain in the southwestern sector. He has also commanded 45 Squadron as a wing commander. He has held other posts including air officer commanding of the Adampur Air Force Station, air defence commander at Western Air Command Headquarters, air defence commander at Eastern Air Command Headquarters, directing staff at Tactics and Air Combat Development Establishment and as a flying inspector in the Directorate of Air Staff Inspection. He also served as a defence attaché at the Indian embassy at Bangkok from 2006 to 2009.

Arora served as Air Officer Commanding-in-Chief, South Western Air Command from 30 September 2018 after superannuation of Air Marshal Ravinder Kumar Dhir, to 30 September 2019. He was succeeded by Air Marshal Surendra Kumar Ghotia.

Arora was appointed the Vice Chief of Air Staff on 28 September 2019 following elevation of Air Marshal Rakesh Kumar Singh Bhaduria as Chief of Air Staff.

Later life and death 
Arora superannuated on 30 June 2021 after 39 years of service. Arora died on 21 January 2023, at the age of 61.

Honours and decorations 
In his career of over 38 years, Arora was awarded the Ati Vishisht Seva Medal in January 2011 and the Param Vishisht Seva Medal in January 2020.

Personal life 
Arora was married to Baljeet; the couple have two sons.

References 

1961 births
2023 deaths
Vice Chiefs of Air Staff (India)
Recipients of the Ati Vishisht Seva Medal
National Defence College, India alumni
Indian air attachés
Defence Services Staff College alumni